This is a technical feature comparison of commercial encrypted external drives.

Background information

 Ironkey was acquired by Kingston Technology in February 2016 
 IronClad is a technology, a secure type of "PC on a stick" (flash drive which has an Operating System included), which runs on top of Ironkey drive. It is also known as a "turnkey solution", as in it "plugs and plays".

Operating systems

Features
 Bootable: Whether (with the appropriate OS installed on the drive and supporting BIOS on a computer) the drive can be used to boot a computer.
 Encryption Type: Type of encryption used.
 Certification: Whether FIPS 140-2 or similar validation has been passed.
 Managed: Whether enterprise level management software for maintaining large numbers of devices is included.
 Interface: List of USB, Firewire, eSATA, or other interfaces for connection a computer.
 Max Capacity: Maximum size drive is available in.
 Included Software: List of any included software, excluding any standard freeware or trialware obtainable by an end user.
 Other Features: Other notable features that differentiate the device.

See also
 Comparison of disk encryption software
 Disk encryption software

Notes and references

Disk encryption
Encrypted external drives
Cryptographic software